Denis Rodionov (born 26 July 1985) is a Kazakh football midfielder who plays for the club Zhetysu.

Rodionov had made 11 appearances for the Kazakhstan national football team.

References

External links

1985 births
Living people
Association football forwards
Kazakhstani footballers
Kazakhstan international footballers
Kazakhstani people of Russian descent